Oeren Heliport  is a private heliport located near Veurne, West Flanders, Belgium. It is also known as Veurne Heliport.

See also
List of airports in Belgium

References

External links 
 Airport record for Oeren Heliport at Landings.com

Airports in West Flanders